Antisana is a stratovolcano of the northern Andes, in Ecuador.

Antisana presents one of the most challenging technical climbs in the Ecuadorian Andes. Next to the Pichincha, Cotopaxi, Tungurahua and Chimborazo, the Antisana belongs to the five volcanic mountains that the Prussian-born explorer Alexander von Humboldt tried to climb in 1802 during his American journey.

See also

Mikakucha
Lists of volcanoes
List of volcanoes in Ecuador
List of mountains in the Andes
List of Ultras of South America

References

External links

 "Volcán Antisana, Ecuador" Peakbagger.com.

Stratovolcanoes of Ecuador
Andean Volcanic Belt
Glaciers of Ecuador
Five-thousanders of the Andes